Spondylus regius, the regal thorny oyster, is a species of bivalve mollusc in the family Spondylidae. It can be found in the Western Pacific, and can grow 156 mm in length.

Distribution and habitat
Spondylus regius is found in the Red Sea, Philippines, Japan, and Coral Sea waters on coral debris from depths of 5 to 80 meters.

References

Taxa named by Carl Linnaeus
Spondylidae
Molluscs of the Indian Ocean
Biota of the Red Sea
Bivalves described in 1758